Punctapinella conchitella is a species of moth of the family Tortricidae. It is found in Peru.

The wingspan is 17.5 mm. The ground colour of the forewings is snow white with cream-ferruginous markings with blackish marks. The hindwings are whitish basally, suffused with brownish grey from beyond the middle and with weak, darker strigulation (fine streaks).

Etymology
The species name refers to the close relationship with Punctapinella conchitis.

References

Moths described in 2010
Euliini